Hajrović is a surname. Notable people with the surname include:

Izet Hajrović (born 1991), Swiss-born Bosnian footballer
Sead Hajrović (born 1993), Bosnia and Herzegovina footballer

Bosnian surnames